DTOT may refer to:
Duct tape occlusion therapy, a method for treating warts by keeping them covered with duct tape for an extended period
Don't Tread on This, a United States Soccer supporters group on Facebook
"Don't Tread on This" is a 2006 song by United States Soccer player Clint Dempsey